Milonga is an event where Argentine tango is danced. The venue dedicated to milongas may also be called "milonga". People who frequently go to milongas may be called milongueros. 

The music played is mainly tango, vals and milonga. Most milongas are held on a regular basis (usually weekly), and they often begin with dancing classes and sometimes demonstration dances. Usually, three to five songs of a kind are played in a row (this is called tanda) followed by a short musical break (called cortina) to clear the dance floor and facilitate partner changes. There are a number of informal rules that dictate how dancers should choose their dancing partners and navigate the floor.

References

Tango dance
Argentine culture